This is a list of Azerbaijan football transfers in the summer transfer window, which takes place between 10 June and 1 September, by club. Only clubs of the 2022–23 Azerbaijan Premier League are included.

Azerbaijan Premier League 2022-23

Gabala

In:

\

Out:

Kapaz

In:

Out:

Neftçi

In:

Out:

Qarabağ

In:

Out:

Sabah

In:

Out:

Sabail

In:

Out:

Shamakhi

In:

Out:

Sumgayit

In:

Out:

Turan-Tovuz

In:

Out:

Zira

In:

Out:

References

Azerbaijan
Azerbaijani football transfer lists
2022–23 in Azerbaijani football